The 2022–23 season was the 55th season in the existence of Hatayspor and the club's third consecutive season in the top flight of Turkish football. In addition to the domestic league, Hatayspor participated in this season's edition of the Turkish Cup. The season covers the period from 1 July 2022 to 30 June 2023.

Season overview

Turkey–Syria earthquake and aftermath
On 12 February 2023, Turkish Football Federation announced Hatayspor's withdrawal from the league due to the 2023 Turkey–Syria earthquake, which widely hit the club's home city.

On 18 February, having been missing since the quake, first-team player Christian Atsu's body was found and he was later pronounced dead. Three days later, the body of sporting director Taner Savut was recovered close to where Atsu had been found.

Players

First-team squad

Out on loan

Pre-season and friendlies

Pre-season

Mid-season

Competitions

Overall record

Süper Lig

League table

Results summary

Results by round

Matches

Turkish Cup

References 

Hatayspor
Hatayspor